Yenikənd (also known as Norshen, Yengikend, and Yenik’end) is a village in the Goranboy Rayon of Azerbaijan.  The village forms part of the municipality of Qaraçinar.

References 

Populated places in Goranboy District